Chuda Mani Upadhaya Regmi is a Nepalese writer and linguist. He has published multiple books related to Nepali language.

Early life and education 
Regmi was born on 11 March 1937 (29 Chaitra 1993) in Wana, Sankhuwasabha district in eastern region of Nepal to father Pitambar Regmi and mother Khileswari Devi. He completed his schooling in Sanskrit language. For his IA degree in Benaras, he continued his Sanskrit studies and studied BA at Mahendra College in Biratnagar.

Literary career 
In 1968, he published the Nepali Bhashako Utpatti. Regmi, Satya Mohan Joshi, Pradip Rimal, Bihari Krishna Shrestha, and Sthirjunga Bahadur published Karnali Lok Sanskriti which won the Madan Puraskar, Nepal's highest literary honour. The prize money was divided among the authors. He played an active role in Jharro Andolan, a Nepali language movement.

He also taught at the Mechi Multiple Campus in Jhapa. He taught for 34 years until he retired in 2002.

Awards 
He has won various awards including the Mahakavi Devkota Puraskar (2015), the Gopal Pande Asim Award (2005), the Sajha Puraskar, and the Madan Puraskar.

Notable works 

 Nepali Sahitya ko Itihas
 Bhasa Bigyan
 Karnali Lok Sanskriti (Vol. 4 - Bhasa)
 Devkota
 Sajha Kavita
 Nepali Loksahitya
 Sinjali: Studies in Linguistic Behaviour

Personal life 
He married Bed Kumari Dahal on 11 December 1949 (26 Mangshir 2006) at the age of 13. They have six children (3 sons and 3 daughters).

See also 

 Satya Mohan Joshi
 Chittaranjan Nepali

References

External links 
 Chuda Mani Regmi on Goodreads

Madan Puraskar winners
Nepalese male writers
Nepali-language writers
Linguists from Nepal
Sajha Puraskar winners
People from Sankhuwasabha District
Nepalese folklorists
1937 births
Living people